Kudalur is a village in the Thanjavur taluk of Thanjavur district, Tamil Nadu, India.

Demographics 

As per the 2001 census, Kudalur had a total population of 1303 with  644 males and  649 females. The sex ratio was 1023. The literacy rate was 68.40.

References 

 

Villages in Thanjavur district